Air guitar is a form of dance and movement in which the performer pretends to play an imaginary rock or heavy metal-style electric guitar, including riffs and solos. Playing an air guitar usually consists of exaggerated strumming and picking motions, and is often coupled with loud singing or lip-synching. Air guitar is generally used in the imaginary simulation of loud electric or acoustic guitar music.

History 

Musical pantomime, the mimicking of the playing of an instrument, originated in the 1860s, when it was considered to be a mental illness. The popularity of the phonograph in the 1930s led to the phenomenon of "shadow conducting", in which listeners would pretend to conduct an orchestra.

Air guitar had a seminal moment at the Woodstock music festival in 1969, when singer Joe Cocker mimicked the playing of the keyboard and guitar during his performance of "With a Little Help From My Friends". Cocker's elaborate signature moves helped introduce the concept of air guitar to the public.

Neal Kay, founder of the Soundhouse heavy metal club in Kingsbury, London, recalls one night in 1976 a club regular named Rob "Loonhouse" Yeatman arrived at the club carrying a piece of hardboard cut into the shape of a Flying V guitar, with no frets or strings. "Suddenly Rob appears in front of everyone and he starts playing it along with the solo and he's absolutely perfect."

One of the first air guitar contests was held at Florida State University in 1978. The term "air guitar" subsequently gained popularity in the 1980s as more contests were held in Sweden and the United States. Since 1996, the annual Air Guitar World Championships have been organized in Oulu, Finland. The first competitions were arranged as part of Oulu Music Video Festival. Since 2011 it has been produced by Airnest Productions Ltd, which also administers the official Air Guitar World Championships Network of licensed national championships. The idea of the contest was originated a joke that was intended to be a side attraction for the music video festival but has since become a major draw in its own right.

Contests

Air guitar contests have much in common with the figure skating scoring system, especially using 6.0 score system. The most common set of rules are as following:

 Each participant has to play air guitar on stage in two rounds, each lasting for one minute.
 Round 1: participant plays a selection of his or her choice. Typically the song has been edited (or a medley has been created) to fit the 60-second format.
 Round 2: participant plays a section of the song chosen by an organizer or competitor; usually the song is not announced beforehand and kept secret until the round begins so the participant has to improvise.
 Participant plays alone; backing bands, either with real or air instruments are not allowed; roadies and groupies are allowed to make up some image but they must leave the stage before performance.
 Participant has to play air guitar (i.e. air drums, piano and other instruments are not allowed). Air guitar can be acoustic, electric or both.
 Generally, there is no dress code and participant is encouraged to use any clothing and props that would add character and make the performance more interesting. Any real musical equipment or crew (instruments, amplifiers, effect pedals, and backing band members) are strictly forbidden. Some events make an exception for a real guitar pick.
 Jury consists of independent judges, usually B-list musicians, music critics, comedians, or other members of the media.
 Judges use the same 6.0 score system as in the traditional figure skating system: there are several varying criteria, and each judge must give the contestant a score from 4.0 to 6.0 on each of the following:
 Technical merit—how much the performance looks like the real playing, including accurate reproduction of all fretwork, chords, solos and technical moves.
 Mimesmanship—how convincingly the performers can mime their performance, and create the illusion of an invisible guitar, apart from the technical accuracy of the fretwork
 Stage presence—a charisma of rock star, the ability to rock, lack of stage fright and power to drive thousands of listeners; involves guitar showmanship and other emotional demonstrations.
 Airness—the most subjective criterion, as "presentation" in figure skating—how much the performance was an object of art by itself, not only a simulation of playing guitar.

World

Annual Air Guitar World Championships were first held in 1996 as part of the Oulu Music Video Festival in Oulu, Finland, and now held there each August. According to the competition ideology, "wars will end, climate change will stop and all bad things will vanish when all the people in the world play the air guitar".

Participants from all over the world compete in skills of playing air guitar. The judges represent professionals of performing arts and culture, the guitarist Juha Torvinen among others. The winner gets a custom-made guitar, ‘Flying Finn’, by Matti and Saara Nevalainen. One year, Brian May, the lead guitarist of Queen, donated a VOX BM Special amplifier for the winner.

Due to the COVID-19 Pandemic, the Air Guitar World Championships were not held in 2020 and 2021.

List of World Championships
List of World Championships

United States
In 2003, Cedric Devitt and Kriston Rucker founded US Air Guitar, the official governing body of air guitar in the US.

The 2004 US Air Guitar Championships featured regional competitions in five cities. MiRi "Sonyk-Rok" Park, winner of the New York City regional, took the national crown by defeating Fatima "The Rockness Monster" Hoang from Los Angeles. She went to Finland, where she tied for first place, becoming the 2004 World Air Guitar Co-Champion.

By 2008, US Air Guitar had expanded to include regional competitions in 24 cities. The 2006 US Air Guitar Champion, Craig "Hot Lixx Hulahan" Billmeier, went on to defeat 2005 Champion Fatima "The Rockness Monster" Hoang and 2007 Champion Andrew "William Ocean" Litz en route to his second national title. In Finland, Hulahan won, securing the United States' third world title and becoming the 2008 World Air Guitar Champion.

William Ocean won his second national title in 2009, earning him a spot in Finland at the 2009 World Air Guitar Championships. Ocean and defending World Air Guitar Champion Hulahan tied for second place, behind Sylvain "Gunther Love" Quimene of France.

In 2020 and 2021, US Air Guitar moved to online competitions, due to the COVID-19 pandemic. The 2021 US Air Guitar season ended with a live, in-person finals in Chicago, IL.

List of United States Championships
List of United States Championships

United Kingdom
The Air Guitar UK Championship was created in 2006 by twice air guitar world champion Zac 'the Magnet' Monroe (the first non-Finn to win the competition) and is affiliated with the Air Guitar World Championships in Oulu, Finland, forming part of the World Air Guitar Network.

In September 2011, Air Guitar UK launched Air Guitar Wales and Air Guitar Northern Ireland to join Air Guitar Scotland (first launched by AGUK in 2009) as part of the Air Guitar UK Network.

Air Guitar UK events are held in support of the Teenage Cancer Trust.

UKAG
UK Air Guitar (UKAG) works regularly with charities including RAFA, The 1800 Club and Action Medical Research.

Innovations

Multiple technological innovations allow air guitar to be played as a real instrument, producing sounds that depend on the air guitarist's actions. In 2005, students from the Helsinki University of Technology developed a system that translates hand movements into electric guitar sounds, resulting in a functional air guitar. The system, consisting of a pair of brightly coloured gloves and an infrared camera, is one of the most popular exhibits at the Helsinki Science Center. The camera recognizes the distance between the two gloves and the strumming movements made by the wearer to synthesize an electric guitar tune, working using only six notes.

In November 2006, researchers at the Australian government's Commonwealth Scientific and Industrial Research Organisation (CSIRO) announced they had developed a tee-shirt that senses human movement to "showcase its expertise in designing and manufacturing electronic and intelligent textiles with which people effortlessly control computers", publicising it as an air guitar shirt.

In 2007, toy company Silverlit introduced V-Beat Air Guitar, a device that consists of a motion-sensing guitar pick, a neck part with four buttons and a guitar body. By changing the distance between body and neck, and pressing a combination of the four buttons on the neck part, up to 48 tones and chords can be played. The V-Beat Air Guitar was won 'Best Music Gadget' on the television program The Gadget Show.

In 2007, a Japanese toy company Takara Tomy introduced Air Guitar Pro (Guitar Rockstar), a functional guitar simulator. Fitting in one hand, the device uses heat and motion sensors to detect the other hand motions and produce guitar sounds.

In March 2008, Jada Toys of California introduced the Air Guitar Rocker toy that included patented technology in a belt buckle. When the user strums a magnetic pick in front of the belt buckle, guitar music plays through a portable amplifier attached to the users pants or belt. The Air Guitar Rocker is marketed with the popular Guitar Hero license and was created by toy inventor David Führer and his team.

See also
 Air Guitar Nation, a documentary film about the 2003 US and World Air Guitar competitions
 Air Guitar in Oulu, a documentary film following a young air guitarist's mission to attend the World Championship in Oulu

References

27 Heavy Metal Britannia BBC TV 2010, 105mins 20secs.

Further reading 
 
 
 
 
 
 
 
 
 
 
"Embodying air guitar with Sydney Hutchinson and Byrd McDaniel," KRUI radio show (August 2018), https://soundcloud.com/krui/embodying-air-guitar-with-sydney-hutchinson-and-byrd-mcdaniel
 

Dance moves
Syllabus-free dance
Guitar performance techniques
Heavy metal subculture
Gestures